The 2000 Japan Series matched the Central League champion Yomiuri Giants against the Pacific League champion and defending Japan Series champion Fukuoka Daiei Hawks. The press called it the ON series because of the managers on both sides: Sadaharu Oh for the Hawks and Shigeo Nagashima for the Giants.  The two were teammates in the 1960s and 1970s, and their combined hitting prowess gave them the nickname, "O-N Cannon."

Fukuoka Daiei Hawks
The defending Japan Series Champions were largely the same team that had taken the field in 1999, with one major exception: left-handed starter Kimiyasu Kudoh had departed as a free agent over the winter and signed with the Giants.  The core of the team was still intact, with Kenji Johjima anchoring a strong lineup that also featured stars Nobuhiko Matsunaka and Hiroki Kokubo.  Pitching-wise, the Hawks saw the big-stage debut of future right-handed ace Kazumi Saitoh, who would make three appearances in relief without giving up a run.

Yomiuri Giants
For the first time in four years, the Giants had reached the Japan Series.  They had not won the series since 1994, when they faced the Seibu Lions.  A lot had changed in the six years since they had won, but the plethora of stars that they had been building since the mid-1990s was finally enough to get back to the Japan Series.  Yomiuri had a powerful middle of the order between aging slugger Kazuhiro Kiyohara and Hideki Matsui.  The pitching staff featured established stars such as Kudoh and Hiromi Makihara.

Summary

See also
2000 World Series

References

Japan Series
Japan Series, 2000
Series
Yomiuri Giants
Fukuoka Daiei Hawks